In 2018, the following events occurred in science fiction.

Deaths

March 8 – Kate Wilhelm, American writer (born 1928)
 Ursula K. Le Guin, a writer of science fiction and fantasy (Hainish Cycle in particular).
 Stephen Hawking, an astrophysicist and writer who greatly influenced science fiction; co-author of children's sci-fi book series George.
 Gardner Dozois, a writer and editor
 Harlan Ellison, a writer.
 Stan Lee, a comic book writer.
 Dave Duncan, writer
 Bertil Mårtensson, writer and philosopher
 Mary Rosenblum, writer
 Helen Mary Hoover, writer
 Michael Anderson, director
 Christopher Stasheff, writer
 David F. Bischoff, writer
 Eddy C. Bertin, writer
 Eric Koch, writer and academic
 Gerald M. Weinberg, writer and computer scientist

Literary releases
 Artificial Condition by Martha Wells
 Ball Lightning by Liu Cixin 
 The Calculating Stars by Mary Robinette Kowal
 The Consuming Fire by John Scalzi
 The Freeze-Frame Revolution by Peter Watts
 Head On by John Scalzi
 Luna: Moon Rising by Ian McDonald
 Mutiny at Vesta by R.E. Stearns
 Record of a Spaceborn Few by Becky Chambers
 Space Opera by Catherynne M. Valente
 Thrawn: Alliances by Timothy Zahn
 The Book of M by Peng Shepherd

Films

Original
 Annihilation
 Anon
 A.X.L.
 The Darkest Minds
 Extinction
 Fahrenheit 451
 Future World
 High Life
 Hotel Artemis
 I Think We're Alone Now
 Kin
 The Meg
 Mortal Engines
 Mute
 Prospect
 A Quiet Place
 Rampage
 Ready Player One
 Replicas
 A Rough Draft (Chernovik)
 Sorry to Bother You
 Tau
 The Titan

Sequels, spin-offs and remakes
 6-Headed Shark Attack
 Alita: Battle Angel
 Ant-Man and the Wasp
 Aquaman
 Avengers: Infinity War
 Black Mirror: Bandersnatch
 Black Panther
 Bumblebee
 The Cloverfield Paradox
 Deadpool 2
 The Death of Superman
 Deep Blue Sea 2
 The Endless
 The First Purge
 Godzilla: City on the Edge of Battle
 Incredibles 2
 Jurassic World: Fallen Kingdom
 Maze Runner: The Death Cure
 Mobile Suit Gundam Narrative
 Pacific Rim: Uprising
 The Predator
 Ralph Breaks the Internet
 Solo: A Star Wars Story
 Spider-Man: Into the Spider-Verse
 Tremors: A Cold Day in Hell
 The Last Sharknado: It's About Time
 Uchu Sentai Kyuranger vs. Space Squad

Television

New series
 3Below: Tales of Arcadia
 Altered Carbon
 Are You Human?
 B: The Beginning
 Better than Humans
 Black Lightning, season 1
 The City and the City
 Cloak & Dagger
 Constantine: City of Demons
 Counterpart
 The Crossing
 Final Space
 The First
 The Gifted
 Hard Sun
 The Hollow
 Impulse
 The King of Blaze
 Krypton
 Life on Mars
 Lost in Space
 Nightflyers
 Origin
 The Rain (TV series)
 Reverie
 Rise of the Teenage Mutant Ninja Turtles
 She-Ra and the Princesses of Power
 Star Blazers: Space Battleship Yamato 2202
 Star Wars Resistance
 Stargate: Origins
 Steins;Gate 0
 Super Dinosaur
 Sweet Dreams
 Titans

Returning series
 12 Monkeys, season 4
 Arrow, season 7
 Black Lightning, season 2
 Colony, season 3
 Daredevil, season 3
 Doctor Who, series 11
 The Expanse, season 3
 FLCL Progressive, FLCL Alternative
 The Flash, season 5
 The Gifted, season 2
 Gundam Build Divers
 The Handmaid's Tale, season 2
 Iron Fist, season 2
 Jessica Jones, season 2
 Kaitou Sentai Lupinranger VS Keisatsu Sentai Patranger
 Kamen Rider Zi-O
 Killjoys, season 4
 The Last Ship, season 5
 Legends of Tomorrow, season 4
 Legion, season 2
 Luke Cage, season 2
 ReBoot: The Guardian Code
 Salvation, season 2
 SciGirls, season 4
 Spy Kids: Mission Critical
 Stargate Origins
 Star Trek: Short Treks
 Star Wars Rebels, season 4
 Supergirl, season 4
 Sword Art Online: Alicization
 Timeless, season 2
 Transformers: Cyberverse
 Travelers, season 3
 Ultraman Orb: The Chronicle
 Ultraman R/B
 Voltron: Legendary Defender, seasons 5–8
 Westworld, season 2
 The X-files, season 11

Video games
 Assassin's Creed Odyssey
 BattleTech
 Destiny 2: Forsaken
 Detroit: Become Human
 Fallout 76
 Fallout: New California
 Far Cry 5
 Frostpunk
 Iconoclasts
 Into the Breach
 Quake Champions
 Spider-Man
 Starlink: Battle for Atlas
 We Happy Few
 Xenoblade Chronicles 2: Torna – The Golden Country

Awards 
 The Handmaid's Tale received
 an American Cinema Editors Award for Best Edited Drama Series for Non-Commercial Television,
 an Art Directors Guild Award for One-Hour Contemporary Single-Camera Television Series,
 an Artios Award from the Casting Society of America for Television Pilot First Season Drama,
 a Costume Designers Guild Award for Excellence in Contemporary Television Series,
 three Critics' Choice Television Awards,
 a Directors Guild of America Award for Outstanding Directing – Drama Series,
 two Golden Globe Awards,
 a Peabody Award as Entertainment, children's and youth honoree,
 the Producers Guild of America Award for Best Episodic Drama,
 two Satellite Awards,
 the USC Scripter Award for Best Adapted TV Screenplay,
 two Writers Guild of America Awards, and
 the British Academy Television Award for Best International Programme

Saturn Award 

 Blade Runner 2049 for Best Science Fiction Film
 The Orville for Best Science Fiction Television Series

Academy Award
 Blade Runner 2049 for best visual effects and best cinematography.

Locus Award
 Best Novel: The Collapsing Empire by John Scalzi

Hugo Award
 Best Novel: The Stone Sky by N. K. Jemisin

Nebula Award
 Best Novel: The Stone Sky by N. K. Jemisin

References

See also

Science fiction by year
2018 in the arts
2018-related lists